Conus fijisulcatus is a species of sea snail, a marine gastropod mollusk in the family Conidae, the cone snails and their allies.

Like all species within the genus Conus, these snails are predatory and venomous. They are capable of "stinging" humans, therefore live ones should be handled carefully or not at all.

Description
The size of the shell varies between 18 mm and 55 mm.

Distribution
This marine species occurs in the Pacific Ocean off Fiji.

References

 Moolenbeek R.G., Röckel D. & Bouchet P. (2008) New records and new species of cones from deeper water off Fiji (Mollusca, Gastropoda, Conidae). Vita Malacologica 6: 35–49.
 Puillandre N., Duda T.F., Meyer C., Olivera B.M. & Bouchet P. (2015). One, four or 100 genera? A new classification of the cone snails. Journal of Molluscan Studies. 81: 1–23

External links
 The Conus Biodiversity website
 
 Holotype in MNHN, Paris

fijisulcatus
Gastropods described in 2008